Route 110, consisting of State Route 110 (SR 110) and Interstate 110 (I-110), is a state and auxiliary Interstate Highway in the Los Angeles metropolitan area of the US state of California. The entire route connects San Pedro and the Port of Los Angeles with Downtown Los Angeles and Pasadena. The southern segment from San Pedro to I-10 in downtown Los Angeles is signed as I-110, while the northern segment to Pasadena is signed as SR 110. The entire length of I-110, as well as SR 110 south of the Four Level Interchange with US Route 101 (US 101), is the Harbor Freeway, and SR 110 north from US 101 to Pasadena is the historic Arroyo Seco Parkway, the first freeway in the western United States.

Route description

Route 110 is part of the California Freeway and Expressway System, and is part of the National Highway System, a network of highways that are considered essential to the country's economy, defense, and mobility by the Federal Highway Administration.

Harbor Freeway
The Harbor Freeway, signed as I-110, begins at Gaffey Street in San Pedro, where it then travels mostly due north to the Santa Monica Freeway (I-10) at a point south of downtown Los Angeles, where it becomes signed as SR 110.

North of I-10, the freeway continues as SR 110 through Downtown Los Angeles to its junction with US 101 at the Four Level Interchange.

The Harbor Freeway, along with the Long Beach Freeway (I-710), are the principal means for freight from the Port of Los Angeles to railyards and warehouses further inland. Its interchange with the Santa Monica Freeway is notoriously busy and congested, and the portions bordering Bunker Hill in northwest Downtown Los Angeles are choked with traffic at peak travel times.

Landmarks
Notable landmarks and attractions near the Harbor Freeway include the Los Angeles Harbor College,  California State University, Dominguez Hills, Watts Towers, Exposition Park (including the Los Angeles Memorial Coliseum, the Banc of California Stadium and the Lucas Museum of Narrative Art), the University of Southern California, Staples Center, L.A. Live, Los Angeles Convention Center, the skyline of Downtown Los Angeles; and Chinatown.

The Harbor Freeway is noted for its elaborate high-occupancy toll lane feature, with the HOT lanes elevated above the rest of traffic in many areas, constructed in 1994 by C.C. Myers, Inc. as HOV lanes and converted to HOT lanes in 2012. Of particular note is the Judge Harry Pregerson Interchange, which contains the most elaborate network of direct HOV/HOT connectors in Los Angeles County. It includes a 7-story ramp that connects the Century Freeway's HOV lanes to the Harbor Freeway's northbound HOT lanes and offers splendid views of the entire Los Angeles Basin and the San Gabriel Mountains. The interchange with SR 91 (formally known as the Edmund J. Russ Interchange) is also fairly large.

Arroyo Seco Parkway

SR 110 continues north as the Arroyo Seco Parkway from US 101 to Pasadena. From downtown, it passes through Elysian Park, where the northbound lanes pass through the four Figueroa Street Tunnels and the higher southbound lanes pass through a cut and over low areas on bridges. Then after crossing the Los Angeles River and the Golden State Freeway (I-5), the parkway runs alongside the Arroyo Seco seasonal river towards Pasadena.

Harbor Transitway
The Harbor Transitway is a grade-separated, shared-use express bus and high-occupancy toll (HOT) corridor, running in the median of I-110, between SR 91 (Gardena Freeway) and Adams Boulevard in the south side of Downtown Los Angeles. Southbound buses exit the HOT lanes at dedicated ramps connecting to the Harbor Gateway Transit Center. Each vehicle using the HOT lanes is required to carry a FasTrak Flex transponder, with its switch set to indicate the number of the vehicle's occupants (1, 2, or 3 or more), regardless of whether they qualify for free.

History

In the 1924 Major Street Traffic Plan for Los Angeles, a widening of Figueroa Street to San Pedro as a good road to the Port of Los Angeles was proposed. Progress was slow, and, in 1933, the state legislature added the entire length to the state highway system as Route 165, an unsigned designation. This route not only extended from San Pedro north to Los Angeles, but continued through the city-built Figueroa Street Tunnels and along the northern extension of Figueroa Street to Eagle Rock, and then followed Linda Vista Avenue (via an overlap on Route 161 (SR 134) over the Colorado Street Bridge) to Route 9 (now I-210) at the Devil's Gate Reservoir. The entire length of Route 165 became Sign Route 11 in 1934. US Route 6 was also assigned to the portion between SR 1 and Avenue 26 in 1937, and, at about the same time, US 66 was moved from Eagle Rock Boulevard to Figueroa Street, overlapping SR 11 between Sunset Boulevard (US 101) and Colorado Street (SR 134).

The state completed the Arroyo Seco Parkway which had been added to the state highway system in 1935 as Route 205, in early 1941, providing a faster route between SR 11 at Avenue 26 and Pasadena. US 66 was moved to the new route, while SR 11 remained on Figueroa Street and Linda Vista Avenue, the former also becoming a new US Route 66 Alternate. Construction of a freeway to San Pedro was much slower, despite having been in the earliest plans for an integrated system. Initially, the Harbor Parkway was to split at the merge with the Venice Parkway northeast of the University of Southern California, with the East By-Pass and West By-Pass straddling the Los Angeles Central Business District and rejoining at the split between the Arroyo Seco Parkway and Riverside Parkway south of Dodger Stadium. The West By-Pass was soon incorporated into the Harbor Parkway, and the first short piece, by then renamed the Harbor Freeway, opened on July 30, 1952, from the Four Level Interchange south to 3rd Street. (The Arroyo Seco Parkway was completed to the Four Level Interchange on September 22, 1953, and renamed the Pasadena Freeway on November 16, 1954.)

The Harbor Freeway gradually pushed south, opening to Olympic Boulevard on March 23, 1954, and Washington Boulevard on May 14, 1954. On March 27, 1956, the highway was extended to 42nd Street, and on April 24, 1957, it reached temporary ramps at 88th Place. Further extensions were made to Century Boulevard on July 31, 1958, 124th Street on September 24, 1958, Alondra Boulevard (which the county widened to carry the load) on May 2, 1960, 190th Street on July 15, 1960, Torrance Boulevard on August 28, 1962, and finally Pacific Coast Highway (SR 1) on September 26, 1962. There it connected with a section that had been open since June 19, 1956, from Pacific Coast Highway south to Channel Street. Along with the Vincent Thomas Bridge to Terminal Island, the final piece in San Pedro opened on July 9, 1970, completing the Harbor Freeway to its present length.

In December 1978, the Harbor Freeway was approved as an Interstate Highway by the FHWA. In 1981, the SR 11 designation was renumbered as I-110 on the Harbor Freeway, and SR 110 on the Pasadena Freeway. The I-110 designation had been previously applied to what is now a spur of I-10 from 1958 to 1968.

Richard Ankrom signage
In 2001, Richard Ankrom, a local artist who got lost trying to get onto I-5 North from northbound I-110 because there was no clear official signage labeling access to I-5 North, solved his frustration by covertly modifying one of the overhead signs on the freeway just before the Four Level Interchange. Using official government sign specifications, Ankrom fabricated two sign pieces, one being an I-5 marker shield and the other with the word "NORTH", and affixed them to the left side of the sign. He performed his modifications in broad daylight, disguised as a Caltrans worker. In that district, Caltrans has three sign crews, each thinking one of the other two crews did the installation. After nine months, at Ankrom's request, the Los Angeles Downtown News broke the story.

Prior to Ankrom's work, the only signage directing motorists to the I-5 North off-ramp came at a quarter-mile (0.4 km) before the exit, thus forcing many to merge across multiple lanes in a very short distance. The signs were inspected by Caltrans to ensure they would not fall off onto the road below. Ankrom was never charged, despite statements from officials that his actions were illegal. Ankrom referred to his sign project as "Guerilla Public Service".

Caltrans later added an additional "5 North" sign over the left northbound lane at the entrance to the Figueroa Street Tunnels, as well as new electric signage, which will note when an additional lane is available for those wishing to transition to northbound I-5 (converting the current single lane transition to dual lanes).

In 2009, Caltrans replaced all signage along this segment with newer, more reflective versions. These new signs include Ankrom's original improvements.

Preservation
Despite the increased traffic in Los Angeles, including trucks shipping products from the Port of Los Angeles in San Pedro, there are no plans to upgrade the rest of I-110 from I-10 to Pasadena to Interstate standards. Instead, Caltrans has pushed for a protected status alternative to preserve the Arroyo Seco Parkway as a historic landmark. The state legislature designated the original section, north of the Figueroa Street Viaduct, as a "California Historic Parkway" (part of the State Scenic Highway System reserved for freeways built before 1945) in 1993; the only other highway so designated is the Cabrillo Freeway (SR 163) in San Diego. The American Society of Civil Engineers named it a National Historic Civil Engineering Landmark in 1999, and it became a National Scenic Byway in 2002.

Exit list

See also

References

External links

Metro ExpressLanes – includes toll information on the I-110 Express Lanes
 A written account of Richard Ankrom's sign modification
 Ankrom's Web page about the signs
 California Highways - Interstate 110
 Harbor Freeway @ Asphaltplanet.ca
California @ AARoads.com - Interstate 110 and California 110
Caltrans: Route 110 highway conditions

1 (California)
10-1
Interstate 10-1
Southern California freeways
10-1 California
Transportation in Los Angeles
State Route 110
Carson, California
110
South Los Angeles
Graffiti and unauthorised signage
110